Dezső Szabó (born 4 September 1967 in Budapest) is a retired Hungarian decathlete. His son, also named Dezső Szabó, competed in pole vault at the 2006 World Junior Championships.

Achievements

Awards
 Hungarian athlete of the Year (1): 1990

External links

1967 births
Living people
Hungarian decathletes
Athletes (track and field) at the 1988 Summer Olympics
Athletes (track and field) at the 1992 Summer Olympics
Athletes (track and field) at the 1996 Summer Olympics
Olympic athletes of Hungary
Athletes from Budapest
European Athletics Championships medalists
Universiade medalists in athletics (track and field)
Universiade gold medalists for Hungary
Universiade bronze medalists for Hungary
Medalists at the 1989 Summer Universiade
Medalists at the 1995 Summer Universiade
20th-century Hungarian people
21st-century Hungarian people